Klaksvíkar Ítróttarfelag II, or simply KÍ II, is a Faroese football club based in Klaksvík. It is the reserve team of the Faroe Islands Premier League club KÍ Klaksvík.

Reserve teams in the Faroe Islands play in the same league system as their senior team, rather than in a reserve league, but they cannot play in the same division as their senior team, so KÍ II is ineligible for promotion to the Faroe Islands Premier League and also cannot play in the Faroe Islands Cup.

Honours
1. deild: 11
1945, 1949, 1951, 1953, 1954, 1956, 1959, 1963, 1972, 1974, 1975
2. deild: 3
1976, 1990, 2011
3. deild: 2
1986, 1989

References

External links
KÍ website

II
Football clubs in the Faroe Islands
Sport in Klaksvík